The Honegg is a mountain of the Emmental Alps, located between Schangnau and Eriz in the canton of Bern.

References

External links
Honegg on Hikr

Mountains of the Alps
Mountains of Switzerland
Mountains of the canton of Bern
Emmental Alps
One-thousanders of Switzerland